is a Japanese actress.

Biography
In 2011, Kadowaki debuted in the television drama, Misaki Number One!!. At the time of her debut she was signed to Blooming Agency.

In 2013, Kadowaki became a hot topic because of a commercial for "Chocola BB Fe Charge (Eisai)", and appeared in the film School Girl Complex Hōsōbu Hen with Aoi Morikawa. In 2014, she appeared in the film Love's Whirlpool as a college student. The same year, Kadowaki earned her first main role in a drama in NTV's Sailor-fuku to Uchūbito (Alien)〜Chikyū ni Nokotta Saigo no 11-ri〜.

Her special skill was classical ballet, which she had studied for twelve years. During her second year in high school, she realized she had to abandon ballet. She did take advantage of her skills, and appeared in a commercial for Tokyo Gas as a ballerina.

Filmography

TV series

Films

Awards

References

External links
 Official profile at Humanite
 

Japanese television actresses
1992 births
Living people
People from Tokyo